Pará de Minas is a Brazilian municipality located in the state of Minas Gerais.

History

17th—18th centuries
The founding of Para de Minas is closely associated with the locomotion of pathfinders and adventurers of the Brazilian Gold Rush seeking gold and precious stones in its surrounding areas in the 1690s.

Many 18th century Brazilian Gold seekers, from the present-day São Paulo state region, established settlements near Pitangui, a nearby town in the Paraopeba River, São João River, and Pará River area of Minas Gerais. The opening of gold mines in the Pitangui area brought many people and wealth to the area during the 18th century.

19th century
Among the many adventurers was a Portuguese named Manuel Batista who established his residence on land that came to be Pará de Minas. Batista, also known as Pato Fofo (or chubby duck), built a chapel dedicated to the Our Lady of Pity next to his farm. The place became known as Patafufo's Settlement and the chapel was elevated to the status of a parish in April 1846, under the control of Pitangui. In 1848 the settlement was raised to the status of town.

The town status was revoked in 1850, since the locals did not meet all the conditions laid out in the law of its emancipation. On June 8, 1858, the settlement was once again elevated to town status and it received the denomination of Vila do Pará. The formal emancipation ceremony took place on 20 September 1859, which became the town's founding date.

On July 15, 1872, the town was reincorporated into the Municipality of Pitangui. The town regained its political autonomy in December 1874, when the Municipality of Pará was created.

Districts 
Pará de Minas is divided in six districts: Pará de Minas (Main District), Córrego do Barro, Carioca, Ascensão, Torneiros, and Tavares de Minas.

See also 
 List of municipalities in Minas Gerais

References 

Municipalities in Minas Gerais
Gold mining in Brazil